California's 25th State Senate district is one of 40 California State Senate districts. It is currently represented by Democrat Anthony Portantino of La Cañada Flintridge.

District profile 
The district encompasses most of the San Gabriel Mountains and its adjacent San Gabriel Valley foothill communities. It stretches from the eastern San Fernando Valley in the west to the far western Inland Empire in the east. Most of the district's population is in the western half of the district, anchored by Glendale and Pasadena.

Los Angeles County – 8.7%
 Altadena
 Bradbury
 Burbank – 85.7%
 Claremont
 Duarte
 Glendale
 Glendora
 La Cañada Flintridge
 La Crescenta-Montrose
 La Verne
 City of Los Angeles – 2.2%
Lake View Terrace – partial
Los Feliz – partial
Sunland-Tujunga
 Monrovia
 Pasadena
 San Dimas
 San Marino
 Sierra Madre
 South Pasadena

San Bernardino County – 3.8%
 Upland

Election results from statewide races

List of senators 
Due to redistricting, the 25th district has been moved around different parts of the state. The current iteration resulted from the 2011 redistricting by the California Citizens Redistricting Commission.

Election results

2020

2016

2012

2008

2004

2000

1996

1992

See also 
 California State Senate
 California State Senate districts
 Districts in California

References

External links 
 District map from the California Citizens Redistricting Commission

25
Government of Los Angeles County, California
Government of San Bernardino County, California
Government of Los Angeles
Government of Pasadena, California
Altadena, California
Angeles National Forest
Burbank, California
Claremont, California
Crescenta Valley
Duarte, California
Glendale, California
Glendora, California
La Cañada Flintridge, California
La Verne, California
Lake View Terrace, Los Angeles
Los Angeles River
Los Feliz, Los Angeles
Monrovia, California
San Gabriel Mountains
San Gabriel Valley
San Dimas, California
San Fernando Valley
San Marino, California
San Rafael Hills
Santa Monica Mountains
Sierra Madre, California
South Pasadena, California
Sunland-Tujunga, Los Angeles
Upland, California
Verdugo Mountains